Acropora derawanensis is a species of acroporid coral that was first described by Carden Wallace in 1997. The species is rated as vulnerable on the IUCN Red List, with a decreasing population. It is not common but found over a large area, and is listed on CITES Appendix II. It is easily damaged.

Description
The radial corallites, on the sides of the branches, are small and tube-shaped, and some can be sharp and "pocket-shaped". This uncommon coral resembles Acropora filiformis and Acropora kirstyae. It reaches maturity at over eight years.

Distribution
Acropora derawanesis is uncommon but found over a large area; central Indo-Pacific. This includes the Micronesia, Philippines, Pohnpei, and Southeast Asia. It is native to Singapore, Papua New Guinea, Indonesia (two regions) Micronesia, Australia, Malaysia, the Philippines, and Thailand. There is no population for it, but it is threatened by the decline of coral reefs, water temperatures increasing causing bleaching, coral disease, climate change, fishing, the acidification of oceans, pollution, and invasive species. Unlike other Acropora species, this species is not threatened by the Acanthaster planci as it is too fragile. Some specimens occur within Marine Protected Areas, it listed as a vulnerable species on the IUCN Red List as the population is decreasing, and is listed under Appendix II of CITES.

Taxonomy
It was first described by C. C. Wallace in 1997 in Indonesia as Acropora derawanensis.

References

Acropora
Cnidarians of the Pacific Ocean
Fauna of the Indian Ocean
Marine fauna of Asia
Marine fauna of Oceania
Fauna of Southeast Asia
Vulnerable fauna of Asia
Vulnerable fauna of Oceania
Animals described in 1997